= Jigalur =

Coordinates: 15°41′N 75°47′E

- Village
- Interactive map of Jigalur
- Country: India
- State: Karnataka
- District: Dharwad

Government
  - Type: Panchayat raj
  - Body: Village Panchayat

Population (2011)
  - Total: 1,044

Languages
  - Official: Kannada
- Time zone: UTC+5:30 (IST)
- ISO 3166 code: IN-KA
- Vehicle registration: KA
- Website: karnataka.gov.in

Jigalur is a village in Gadag district of Karnataka, India.

== Demographics ==
As of the 2011 Census of India there were 208 households in Jigalur and a total population of 1,044 consisting of 554 males and 490 females. There were 115 children ages 0–6.
